Square was a short-lived musical trio from Lincoln, Nebraska who moved to Southern California in early 2000. It was composed of Sean Beste (vocals and keyboards), James Valentine (guitars) and Ryland Steen (drums). Their sound has been described as including elements of rock, pop, and jazz fusion.

The band moved to Orange County after entering an Ernie Ball-sponsored band competition. They won the grand prize, beating 600 other entrants.  Shortly after winning the competition, they released their only full-length album, This Magnificent , on an indie label called Lucy Smith Music. The band started playing many gigs in the area, including some with local band Kara's Flowers.

In 2001, the members of Kara's Flowers asked Valentine to join their group, an invitation that he accepted, effectively dissolving Square. Kara's Flowers changed its name to Maroon 5 and became one of the most commercially successful acts of the mid-2000s. Steen later joined the established ska band Reel Big Fish. Beste (who was initially upset and unhappy by Valentine's decision to leave Square but says he no longer harbors any ill will) started a band called The Excuse and moved to Portland, Oregon for several years. He has since returned to the Los Angeles area and has done some work with the band Maxeen.

Band members
1999 – 2001
Sean Beste – vocals, keyboards
James Valentine – lead guitar
Ryland Steen – drums

References

External links
 Square Official Website (Webarchive)
 Square CD Baby website (Webarchive)
 Square's MySpace page

Musical groups from Nebraska